Jacques Distler (born January 1, 1961) is a Canadian-born American physicist working in string theory. He has been a professor of physics at the University of Texas at Austin since 1994.

Early life and education
Distler was born to a Jewish family in Montreal, Quebec, Canada, where he attended Herzliah High School (Snowdon).  He attended Harvard University for both his bachelors and doctorate in physics. His 1987 thesis Compactified String Theories was supervised by Sidney Coleman.

Physics career
Before going to Texas, he was assistant professor at Princeton University.

According to citation counts, his most influential publication is his 1989 paper on conformal field theory in two dimensions.  His earliest paper is Gauge Invariant Superstring Field Theory, co-authored with André LeClair and published in 1986 in Nuclear Physics B.

He has studied the "landscape" of metastable vacua in string theory. In July 2005, he released a paper on this topic.  Professor Distler was a member of arXiv's physics advisory board.

He has a blog Musings: Thoughts on Science, Computing, and Life on Earth, one of the first theoretical physics blogs in the world.

Personal life
Distler maintains a webpage dedicated to his father, who was born in Poland and escaped the German slave camps of World War II.

Notes

References 
 A. LeClair and J. Distler, Gauge Invariant Superstring Field Theory, Nucl. Phys. B273 (1986) 552.
 J. Distler and H. Kawai, Conformal Field Theory and 2-D Quantum Gravity or Who's Afraid of Joseph Liouville?, Nucl. Phys. B321 (1989) 509.

External links
Faculty homepage
Musings, the blog of Jacques Distler
INSPIRE-HEP publication list
Google-Scholar publication list, for some reason this gives slightly lower citation counts than INSPIRE, for example INSPIRE gives 907 citations for one paper while Google-Scholar gives a figure of 800

1961 births
Living people
Harvard College alumni
Scientists from Montreal
American string theorists
University of Texas at Austin faculty
21st-century American physicists
Harvard Graduate School of Arts and Sciences alumni